Your Health Now was a free, bi-monthly health magazine provided by Merck & Co., Inc. The magazine was launched in September 2005 and was available by mail, online, and in doctors’ offices. The magazine was headquartered in Whitehouse Station, New Jersey.

Every issue included articles on various health topics, updates on patient assistance programs, an “Ask the Doctors” section in which reader questions are answered by medical experts, and information on caring for your pet. The magazine was based on information from The Merck Manuals and reviewed by an independent board of medical professionals and patient advocacy organizations.

In 2006 the magazine started a Spanish version.

References

External links
 YourHealthNow.com

Lifestyle magazines published in the United States
Bimonthly magazines published in the United States
Free magazines
Health magazines
Magazines established in 2005
Magazines with year of disestablishment missing
Magazines published in New Jersey
Spanish-language magazines
Defunct magazines published in the United States